Eddica minor. Dichtungen eddischer Art aus den Fornaldarsögur und anderen Prosawerken. ("The Lesser Edda. Poems of Eddic type from the Fornaldarsögur and Other Prose Works.") is a German-language book of Eddic poetry compiled by Andreas Heusler and Wilhelm Ranisch in 1903. Unlike the Eddic poetry published in the Poetic Edda (whose main source is the Codex Regius), the poems in Eddica minora were extracted by the authors mostly from the Legendary sagas.

The first 110 pages of the book contains detailed introductions to each poem, including its manuscripts. The second half of the book contains transcriptions of the ancient poems.

List of poems
Das Lied Von Der Hunnenschlacht (from the Saga of Hervör and Heidrek)
Das Hervǫrlied (from the Saga of Hervör and Heidrek)
Die Biarkamál
Das Innsteinslied (from the Saga of Half and His Heroes)
Der Víkarsbálkr (from Gautrek's Saga)
Das Hrókslied (from the Saga of Half and His Heroes)
Hiálmars Sterbelied (from Örvar-Oddr's Saga and the Saga of Hervör and Heidrek)
Hildibrands Sterbelied (from Ásmundar saga kappabana)
Ǫrvar-Odds Sterbelied (from Örvar-Oddr's Saga)
Das Valkyrjenlied (from Njál's saga)
Kleinere Bruchstücke
Aus der Vaterrache der Hálfdanssöhne
Aus dem Kampf auf Sámsey
Aus der Heiðrekssaga
Aus Einem Starkaðliede
Ǫrvar-Odds Männervergleich (from Örvar-Oddr's Saga)
Útsteins Kampfstrophen (from the Saga of Half and His Heroes)
Ǫrvar-Oddr in Biálkaland (from Örvar-Oddr's Saga)
Scheltgespräche Ketils und Gríms (from the Saga of Ketil Trout and the Saga of Grim Shaggy-Cheek)
Ketill und Gusir
Ketill und die Hexe
Ketill und Framarr
Grímr und die Hexen
Ásmundr auf der Hochzeit (from Ásmundar saga kappabana)
Hervǫr bei Jarl Biartmarr (from the Saga of Hervör and Heidrek)
Lausavísur
Weissagestrophen aus der Hálfssaga (from the Saga of Half and His Heroes)
Víkars Schicksal
Hiǫrleifr enn kvennsami
Weissagestrophen aus der Ǫrvar-Oddssaga (from Örvar-Oddr's Saga)
Strophe des Haugbúi aus der Hálfssaga (from the Saga of Half and His Heroes)
Die Strophen des Trémaðr aus der Ragnarssaga (from the Tale of Ragnar Lodbrok)
Besprechung eines Trolls
in der Hálfssaga (from the Saga of Half and His Heroes)
in der Ketilssaga (from the Saga of Ketil Trout)
Strophen aus der Ketils- und der Grímssaga (from the Saga of Ketil Trout and the Saga of Grim Shaggy-Cheek)
Strophe des Refr aus der Gautrekssaga (from Gautrek's Saga)
Spottstrophen des Án bogsveigir
Strophen der Friðþiófssaga (from Frithiof's Saga)
Ein Danz (from the Saga of Án the bow-bender)
Katalogstrophen
Königskatalog. Aus der Hervararsaga
Die Arngrímssöhne. Aus der Ǫrvar-Oddssaga
Die Heiðreks Gátur (from the Saga of Hervör and Heidrek)
Die Geizhalsstrophen (from Gautrek's Saga)
Die Vǫlsistrophen (from Völsa þáttr in Flateyjarbók)
Die Buslubœn (from Bósa saga ok Herrauðs)
Die Tryggðamál (from the Gray Goose Laws, Grettis saga and Heiðarvíga saga)

References

External links
Eddica minora - Google Books

 
Icelandic literature
Old Norse literature
Scandinavian folklore
Skaldic poetry
Sources of Norse mythology